Sedapatti Suryanarayana Rajendran, also known by his initials SSR (January 1928 – 24 October 2014), was an Indian actor, director, producer and politician who worked in Tamil theatre and cinema.

Film career
Rajendran made his acting debut with  the 1952 film Parasakthi, directed by the directing duo Krishnan–Panju, with the character Gnanasekharan.  He followed with Mudhalali, President Panchatcharam, Pillai Kani Amudhu, Thalai Koduthan Thambi, Thedi Vandha Selvam, C. N. Annadurai's Edhayum Thangum Idhayam, M. Karunanidhi's Avan Pithana, Poompuhar and Modern Theatres Kumudham. SSR acted with M. G. Ramachandran in Raja Desingu as Mohamed Khan and in Kaanji Thalaivan as Paranjothi. He had worked in many films with Sivaji Ganesan such as Manohara, Rangoon Radha, Raja Rani, Deivapiravi, Aalayamani, Pachai Vilakku, Pazhani, Kungumam, Santhi and Kai Kodutha Dheivam.

Other notable films were Sorgavasal, Ammaiyappan, Ratha Kanneer, Kula Dheivam, Thai Pirandhal Vazhi Pirakkum, Kalyanikku Kalyanam, Sivagangai Seemai, also in  AVM's Kaakum Karangal, Poomalai and K. Balachander's Ethiroli.

His drama company SSR Nadaka Mandram staged plays includingOr Iravu (C. N. Annadurai), Manimagudam (M. Karunanidhi) and Thenpaandi Veeran (P. Nedumaran). He introduced and gave opportunities to actress Manorama.

Director K. S. Gopalakrishnan was introduced from his film Saradha (a silver jubilee hit) and Saradha Studios was established to commemorate the success of this film by its producer A. L. Srinivasan. Likewise, SSRs film Thai Pirandhal Vazhi Pirakkum, in which his co-star was Raja Sulochana, was a successful film in 1958.

Personal life

He had 8 children named Elangovan, Rajendrakumar, Kalaivanan, Bhagyalakshmi, Selvaraj, Ravikumar, Kannan & Lakshmi Sitara

Political life
He joined the Dravida Munnetra Kazhagam (DMK) party and became the first elected member of a legislative assembly among actors in India when he was elected to the Tamil Nadu legislative assembly as a DMK candidate Theni (State Assembly Constituency) in 1962 Madras State legislative assembly election. Subsequently, he was elected as  a member (MP) of Rajya Sabha. He joined the All India Anna Dravida Munnetra Kazhagam (AIADMK) and was elected from Andipatti constituency in the 1980 assembly election.He shared good friendship with ,M.G.R and  Kalaingar

Personal interests
Rajendran, being a strict follower of Periyar E. V. Ramasamy's policy of rationalism, never acted in films based on Ithihasas and Puranas. He earned the sobriquet "Latchiya Nadigar" (Idealistic Actor) as he never acted in films against his policy.

Death
Rajendran was admitted into Chennai Meenakshi hospital on 20 October 2014 to treat a lung infection. He died on 24 October 2014.

Filmography

Actor

References

External links
 Acting, the SSR Way in My Movie Minutes

1928 births
2014 deaths
Dravida Munnetra Kazhagam politicians
Male actors in Tamil cinema
Tamil Nadu politicians
People from Madurai district
Periyarists
All India Anna Dravida Munnetra Kazhagam politicians